Camper may refer to:
 A person who engages in recreational camping
 A trailer (vehicle) used for camping:
 Popup camper
 Travel trailer
 Truck camper
 Recreational vehicle
 Campervan
 Camping (gaming), a tactic in video gaming.

People
 Carter Camper (born 1988), American ice hockey player
 Franklin J. Camper, former American soldier and known mercenary Braulis
 Karen Camper (born 1958), American politician
 Jennifer Camper, American comics artist, graphic artist and editor residing in Brooklyn, New York
 Petrus Camper (1722–1789), Dutch anatomist

Companies
 Camper (company), a Spanish shoe company

See also
 Camp (disambiguation)
 Camper Fascia, a thick, superficial layer of the anterior abdominal wall
 Camper Van Beethoven, an American alternative rock band
 Camper Vantiquities, a 1993 rarities compilation album by Camper Van Beethoven
 Campers Island (disambiguation)
 Kamper, a surname